Church of St. Giles in Kraków is a Roman Catholic church of the Dominican Order located on Grodzka Street in Kraków. Its history dates to 11th century; it has been rebuilt many times since.

This is the only Roman Catholic church in Krakow with Holy Mass in English every Sunday. Thus, it caters to foreigners living in Krakow and tourists visiting the city.

External links 
  Church homepage

11th-century Roman Catholic church buildings in Poland
Giles